The  of the University of Santo Tomas (pl. ) is the highest-ranking officer and chief administrator of the University of Santo Tomas (UST), the oldest and the largest Catholic university in Manila, Philippines. The rector typically sits as chief executive and chair of the university board of trustees. He exercises policy-making as well as general academic, managerial, and religious functions over all university academic and non-academic staff. His term lasts for four years and he is qualified for re-election for two or more terms.

In theory, the highest official of the university is the chancellor, but his role is largely ceremonial and he does not exercise authority over the day-to-day operations of the university. The current Master of the Order of Preachers is the ex officio chancellor of the university and the Head of the Dominican Province in the Philippines serves as his de facto vice.

The incumbent rector is the Richard Ang.

Selection process

Eligibility 
Since the establishment of UST in 1611, in order to serve as Rector Magnificus of the university, one must be:
 a member of the Order of Preachers;
 a professor; and
 a holder of a Doctorate degree (Normally, and in most cases a sacred theology or canon law holder).

Election

Early years 
During the early years of UST, the selection of new rector took place during the elective chapters meetings which were formally assembled in every two years. These board meetings were constituted by the different superiors of the Dominican houses throughout the Philippines. Among themselves, the heads of the Dominican convents then nominate their three candidates. The list of three candidates selected for rectorship is called a ternia. The ternia shall be then conveyed to the Master General in Rome for his approval once the provincial chapter has generated the list of nominees.

The pontification of the  during the eighteenth century was coded by the statute similar to that being used at the University of Mexico during that time.

Current method 
Nowadays, a new rector is being selected by process of election. The outset of the election is the selection of three candidates for rectorship through a secret balloting among the members of Saint Thomas Aquinas Priory in UST. The group shall then communicate with the Vice-Grand Chancellor the list of candidates they had selected. Also the prior of the Dominicans in the Philippines, the Vice-Grand Chancellor will pass the list to the Academic Senate and to the board of trustees. Through this process, rank of preference for the candidates is being determined with their credentials and eligibility being evaluated.

The Board of Trustees will then present decision and recommendations to the Vice-Grand Chancellor for dissemination to the Roman Curia, headed by the Master General. A candidate will be designated by the Master General, who requests the Congregation for Catholic Education in the Vatican City for the required confirmatio and, eventually, for the final approval of the nomination.

Once nothing impedes the nomination (after conducting the usual procedures of inquiry regarding the candidate's merits and suitability), a pertinent rescript is issued by the Congregation for Catholic Education. This document is sent to the Master General of the Order of Preachers, who communicates the act to the competent authorities of the Pontifical and Royal University of Santo Tomas.

This custom of electing rectors, which usually takes three to four months, was observed when UST was bestowed the title of "Pontifical University". This election method was first implemented as Fr. Manuel Arellano, O.P. was elected rector of the university in 1923.

Tenure 
Although records show that tenures lasted two years during the 1600s to the 1800s, the term of office for the university's  is four years. He is eligible for re-election for two or more terms.

Vacancy 
Vacancies in the office of the rector may arise under several possible circumstances: death and resignation.

As stated in Article 11 of the General Statutes of UST, an acting assignment applies to a vacant position by which the vice-rector of the university de facto assumes the acting post until the duly appointment of a new .

Regalia

Collar 
The collar of the rector signifies the joint powers of the Holy See and the Philippine Government, which collaborate to sustain this historic University. It is also symbolic of the supreme teaching authority of the rector as a professor of the university. The collar was first used during the installation of the first Filipino rector, Archbishop Leonardo Legaspi, O.P., S.Th.D., in 1971.

Maces 

Made of pure silver and measuring 95 x 15 centimetres in diameter, the maces have existed since the 17th century and has been used in academic processions ever since. Candidates for doctoral degrees were accompanied by the Rector in a parade called Paseo de los Doctores from Intramuros to Santo Domingo Church, where University commencement exercises were held until the 17th century.

Today, members of the Academic Senate hold processions at the opening of each academic year and during solemn investitures in academic gowns, following the style of Spanish academic regalia. The maces are borne by bedeles (mace-bearers) and are included in the parade for their academic symbolism.

List of rectores magnifici 
Since its foundation in 1611, the University of Santo Tomas has been under the leadership of 110 rectors including acting rectors and double term service. Thirteen of which are rectors prior to its conversion to university status in 1645, and the remaining 97 are university rectors.

Fr. Domingo González, O.P. was the first college rector while Fr. Martin Real de la Cruz, O.P. served as the first university rector and chancellor. The university had acting rectors, whose service lasted for at least one academic year, have been appointed as  afterwards, namely: Fr. Francisco Gómez (1714–1716), Fr. Juan Álvarez (1722–1723), Fr. Eugenio Jordan (1944–1948), and Fr. Rolando de la Rosa (2008–2012).

The rector who served the longest term, but not necessarily consecutively, was also the first rector of the then Colegio de Nuestra Señora del Santísimo Rosario, Fr. Domingo González, O.P. He served for four terms, for a total of 15 years. The second longest term, though not consecutively, was held by Fr. Rolando de la Rosa, O.P. who served from 1990 to 1998, and from 2007 to 2012 for a total of 13 years. Meanwhile, it was Fr. Francisco Ayala, O.P. who served the longest consecutive term, his rectorship having lasted for 12 years, from 1829 to 1841.

 Color key:
 – Rector without double term service but served for two or more terms
 – Rector with double term service and served for three or more terms
 – Rector with double term service only
 – Acting rector
 – nth term being served at the time

References